The 2022 LA Galaxy season was the club's 27th season of existence, and their 27th in Major League Soccer, the top-tier of the American soccer pyramid. LA Galaxy played its home matches at Dignity Health Sports Park in the LA suburb of Carson, California. The Galaxy attempted to make the playoffs after failing to qualify in 2021, also attempted to win their MLS leading 6th MLS Cup, and make their first appearance in the MLS Cup since 2014.

Background 

The 2021 season was the Galaxy's 26th season of existence, and their first under manager, Greg Vanney, who was appointed manager during the 2020–21 offseason following the sacking of Guillermo Barros Schelotto. Early on in the season, the Galaxy started off with an 8–4–0 record, with striker Javier Hernández leading the club in scoring with 11 goals. However, a mixture of injuries and poor form caused the club go on a skid during the summer, and ultimately, on the final day of the season, failing to qualify for the MLS Cup Playoffs for the second-consecutive season. It marked the third time in the past four seasons that the Galaxy failed to qualify for the playoffs.

Outside of MLS, the Galaxy had planned to participate in the 2021 U.S. Open Cup, which featured a modified qualification method due to COVID-19 pandemic. The method involves the eight MLS clubs with the best regular season records after three matches qualifying for the tournament. By this method, the Galaxy had the seventh best record and qualified. However, the tournament was ultimately canceled by U.S. Soccer due to logistical challenges faced by lower league clubs.

Club

Team management

Roster

Non-competitive

Preseason friendlies 
Preseason friendlies announced on January 5, 2022. LA Galaxy later announced more preseason matches on January 18, 2022, in addition to announcing that the club will also host the Coachella Valley Invitational at Empire Polo Club in Indio, California from February 10 to 19, 2022.

Coachella Valley Invitational

Midseason friendlies

Competitive

Major League Soccer

Standings

Overall

Western Conference

Regular season

February

March

April

May

June

July

August

September

October

Playoffs 

All times are in Pacific Time Zone.

First round

Conference Semifinals

U.S. Open Cup

Third round 
The draw for the third round was held on April 8, 2022.

Round of 32 
The draw for the round of 32 was held on April 21, 2022.

Round of 16 
The draw for the Round of 16 and the Quarter-final was held on May 12, 2022.

Quarter-final

Statistics

Appearances and goals 
Numbers after plus-sign(+) denote appearances as a substitute.

|-
! colspan=14 style=background:#dcdcdc; text-align:center| Goalkeepers

|-
! colspan=14 style=background:#dcdcdc; text-align:center| Defenders

|-
! colspan=14 style=background:#dcdcdc; text-align:center| Midfielders

|-
! colspan=14 style=background:#dcdcdc; text-align:center| Forwards

|-

Top scorers

Top assists 
{| class="wikitable sortable" style="font-size: 95%; text-align: center;"
|-
!width=30|Rank
!width=30|Position
!width=30|Number
!width=175|Name
!width=75|
!width=75|
!width=75|Total
|-
|1
|MF
|44
|align="left"| Raheem Edwards
|5
|1
|6

|-
|2
|MF
|11
|align="left"| Samuel Grandsir
|3
|2
|5

|-
|3
|MF
|6
|align="left"| Rayan Raveloson
|3
|0
|3

|-
|rowspan="2"|4
|FW
|99
|align="left"| Dejan Joveljić
|2
|0
|2

|-
|FW
|26
|align="left"| Efraín Álvarez
|1
|1
|2

|-
|rowspan="5"|5
|DF
|2
|align="left"| Julián Araujo
|1
|0
|1

|-
|DF
|3
|align="left"| Derrick Williams
|1
|0
|1

|-
|MF
|7
|align="left"| Víctor Vázquez
|1
|0
|1

|-
|MF
|16
|align="left"| Sacha Kljestan
|1
|0
|1

|-
|MF
|9
|align="left"| Kévin Cabral
|0
|1
|1

Clean sheets
{| class="wikitable sortable" style="font-size: 95%; text-align: center;"
|-
!width=30|Rank
!width=30|Number
!width=175|Name
!width=75|
!width=75|
!width=75|
!width=75|Total
|-
|1
|1
|align="left"| Jonathan Bond
|7
|1
|0
|8
|-
|2
|33
|align="left"| Jonathan Klinsmann
|0
|0
|1
|1

Disciplinary record 
{| class="wikitable" style="font-size: 100%; text-align:center;"
|-
| rowspan="2" !width=15|
| rowspan="2" !width=15|
| rowspan="2" !width=120|Player
| colspan="3"|MLS
| colspan="3"|U.S. Open Cup
| colspan="3"|Total
|-
!width=34; background:#fe9;|
!width=34; background:#fe9;|
!width=34; background:#ff8888;|
!width=34; background:#fe9;|
!width=34; background:#fe9;|
!width=34; background:#ff8888;|
!width=34; background:#fe9;|
!width=34; background:#fe9;|
!width=34; background:#ff8888;|
|-
|10
|FW
|align="left"| Douglas Costa
|1
|0
|0
|0
|0
|0
|1
|0
|0
|-

Transfers

Transfers in

Transfers out

Draft picks 

Draft picks are not automatically signed to the team roster. Only those who are signed to a contract will be listed as transfers in.

References

External links 
 

LA Galaxy seasons
La Galaxy
La Galaxy
LA Galaxy